Liam Horrigan is a former professional rugby league footballer who played in the 1990s. He played at representative level for Ireland, and at club level for Woolston Rovers (in Warrington).

Playing career

International honours
Liam Horrigan won caps for Ireland while at Woolston Rovers 1995 2-caps.

Post retirement
In 2013 he started at Manchester Academy as Vice Principal – Safeguarding & Operations

References

Ireland national rugby league team players
Living people
Place of birth missing (living people)
Year of birth missing (living people)